The Khoshey (Khowar: Khow, Chitrali: Khosh Yemeni) are a Kho tribe residing in the Torkhow, Mulkhow,  Laspur, Chitral, Drosh, Tirich Mir, Ayon, Chitral District of Khyber-Pakhtunkhwa province of Pakistan and Badakhshan. The Khoshey speak the Khowar language.

Social groups of Pakistan
Dardic peoples
Chitral District